The Jingxing Road Mosque was a mosque in Yangpu District, Shanghai, China.

History
The mosque was established in 1947.

Architecture
The mosque was located at a land area of 132 m2 with a total build up area of 185 m2.

See also
 Islam in China
 List of mosques in China

References

1947 establishments in China
Destroyed mosques
Mosques completed in 1947